The Northeast Conference (NEC) Men's Basketball Player of the Year is an annual college basketball award given to the Northeast Conference's most outstanding player. The award was first given following the 1982–83 season, when the league was known as the ECAC Metro Conference.

The most well-recognized NEC Player of the Year is Marist's Rik Smits, who won the award in 1987 and 1988. Smits went on to have a successful National Basketball Association (NBA) career for 12 seasons (1988–2000), all with the Indiana Pacers. In 1998, Smits was named an Eastern Conference All-Star. In 2021–22, Alex Morales of Wagner became just the fourth NEC player to be named Player of the Year for two consecutive seasons, and the first since Charles Jones of Long Island University in 1997 and 1998.

LIU has the most winners with eight, all of whom represented Long Island University's Brooklyn campus before the school merged the athletic programs of its Brooklyn and Post campuses in July 2019. Robert Morris, which left the NEC for the Horizon League in 2020, is in second with six. All charter members of the Northeast Conference that are still members have had at least one winner.

Key

Winners

Winners by school

Footnotes

 In addition, one charter member, Towson University (then Towson State University), left after the conference's first season of 1981–82, before the Player of the Year Award was created. The Tigers left for the East Coast Conference, and are now in the Colonial Athletic Association.

References
General
 

Specific

NCAA Division I men's basketball conference players of the year
Player
Awards established in 1983